This is a list of electoral divisions and wards in the ceremonial county of Nottinghamshire in the East Midlands. All changes since the re-organisation of local government following the passing of the Local Government Act 1972 are shown. The number of councillors elected for each electoral division or ward is shown in brackets.

County council

Nottinghamshire
Electoral Divisions from 1 April 1974 (first election 12 April 1973) to 7 May 1981:

Electoral Divisions from 7 May 1981 to 5 May 2005:

† minor boundary changes in 1989

Electoral Divisions from 5 May 2005 to 4 May 2017:

Electoral Divisions from 4 May 2017 to present:

Unitary authority council

Nottingham
Wards from 1 April 1974 (first election 7 June 1973) to 6 May 1976:

Wards from 6 May 1976 to 1 May 2003:

Wards from 1 May 2003 to 2 May 2019:

Wards from 2 May 2019 to present:

District councils

Ashfield
Wards from 1 April 1974 (first election 7 June 1973) to 6 May 1976:

Wards from 6 May 1976 to 1 May 2003:

Wards from 1 May 2003 to 7 May 2015:

Wards from 7 May 2015 to present:

Bassetlaw
Wards from 1 April 1974 (first election 7 June 1973) to 3 May 1979:

Wards from 3 May 1979 to 2 May 2002:

Wards from 2 May 2002 to present:

Broxtowe
Wards from 1 April 1974 (first election 7 June 1973) to 6 May 1976:

Wards from 6 May 1976 to 1 May 2003:

Wards from 1 May 2003 to 7 May 2015:

Wards from 7 May 2015 to present:

Gedling
Wards from 1 April 1974 (first election 7 June 1973) to 6 May 1976:

Wards from 6 May 1976 to 1 May 2003:

Wards from 1 May 2003 to 7 May 2015:

Wards from 7 May 2015 to present:

Mansfield
Wards from 1 April 1974 (first election 7 June 1973) to 3 May 1979:

Wards from 3 May 1979 to 1 May 2003:

Wards from 1 May 2003 to 5 May 2011:

Wards from 5 May 2011 to present:

Newark and Sherwood
Wards from 1 April 1974 (first election 7 June 1973) to 3 May 1979:

Wards from 3 May 1979 to 1 May 2003:

Wards from 1 May 2003 to 3 May 2007:

Wards from 3 May 2007 to 7 May 2015:

Wards from 7 May 2015 to present:

Rushcliffe
Wards from 1 April 1974 (first election 7 June 1973) to 6 May 1976:

Wards from 6 May 1976 to 1 May 2003:

Wards from 1 May 2003 to 7 May 2015:

Wards from 7 May 2015 to present:

Electoral wards by constituency

Ashfield
Brinsley, Eastwood North and Greasley (Beauvale), Eastwood South, Jacksdale, Kirkby in Ashfield Central, Kirkby in Ashfield East, Kirkby in Ashfield West, Selston, Sutton in Ashfield Central, Sutton in Ashfield East, Sutton in Ashfield North, Sutton in Ashfield West, Underwood, Woodhouse.

Bassetlaw
Beckingham, Blyth, Carlton, Clayworth, East Retford East, East Retford North, East Retford South, East Retford West, Everton, Harworth, Langold, Misterton, Ranskill, Sturton, Sutton, Welbeck, Worksop East, Worksop North, Worksop North East, Worksop North West, Worksop South, Worksop South East.

Broxtowe
Attenborough, Awsworth, Beeston Central, Beeston North, Beeston Rylands, Beeston West, Bramcote, Chilwell East, Chilwell West, Cossall and Kimberley, Greasley (Giltbrook and Newthorpe), Nuthall East and Strelley, Nuthall West and Greasley (Watnall), Stapleford North, Stapleford South East, Stapleford South West, Toton and Chilwell Meadows, Trowell.

Gedling
Bonington, Burton Joyce and Stoke Bardolph, Carlton, Carlton Hill, Daybrook, Gedling, Killisick, Kingswell, Mapperley Plains, Netherfield and Colwick, Phoenix, Porchester, St James, St Marys, Valley, Woodthorpe.

Mansfield
Berry Hill, Birklands, Broomhill, Cumberlands, Eakring, Forest Town East, Forest Town West, Grange Farm, Ladybrook, Leeming, Lindhurst, Meden, Oak Tree, Pleasley Hill, Portland, Priory, Ravensdale, Robin Hood, Sherwood.

Newark
Balderton North, Balderton West, Beacon, Bingham East, Bingham West, Bridge, Castle, Caunton, Collingham and Meering, Cranmer, Devon, East Markham, Farndon, Lowdham, Magnus, Muskham, Oak, Rampton, Southwell East, Southwell North, Southwell West, Sutton-on-Trent, Thoroton, Trent, Tuxford, Winthorpe.

Nottingham East
Arboretum, Berridge, Dales, Mapperley, St Ann's, Sherwood.

Nottingham North
Aspley, Basford, Bestwood, Bilborough, Bulwell, Bulwell Forest.

Nottingham South
Bridge, Clifton North, Clifton South, Dunkirk and Lenton, Leen Valley, Radford and Park, Wollaton East and Lenton Abbey, Wollaton West.

Rushcliffe
Abbey, Compton Acres, Cotgrave, Edwalton Village, Gamston, Gotham, Keyworth North, Keyworth South, Lady Bay, Leake, Lutterell, Manvers, Melton, Musters, Nevile, Ruddington, Soar Valley, Stanford, Tollerton, Trent, Trent Bridge, Wiverton,
Wolds.

Sherwood
Bestwood Village, Bilsthorpe, Blidworth, Boughton, Calverton, Clipstone, Edwinstowe, Farnsfield, Lambley, Newstead, Ollerton, Rainworth, Ravenshead, Woodborough.

See also
List of parliamentary constituencies in Nottinghamshire

References

Politics of Nottinghamshire
Nottinghamshire